The ERRs are orphan nuclear receptors, meaning the identity of their endogenous ligand has yet to be unambiguously determined. They are named because of sequence homology with estrogen receptors, but do not appear to bind estrogens or other tested steroid hormones. 

There are three human estrogen related receptors:
 ERRα
 ERRβ
 ERRγ

ERRs bind enhancers throughout the genome where they exert effects on gene regulation. The ERR family exhibit varying transcriptional activation capabilities and physically interact with the transcriptional co-activators PGC1-alpha and PGC1-beta, via their AF-2 domains and the leucine-rich nuclear receptor interacting motifs (LxxLL) present in the PGC-1 proteins, The ERR family have been demonstrated to control energy homeostasis, oxidative metabolism, and mitochondrial biogenesis, while effecting mammalian physiology in the heart, brown adipose tissue, white adipose tissue, placenta, macrophages, and demonstrated additional roles in diabetes and cancer. The contributions of individual ERRs to physiology continue to be elucidated through the generation of sophisticated tissue-specific gene knockout mouse models.

References

External links 
 
 
 
 

Human female endocrine system
3